Livingston Campus, originally named Kilmer Area by Rutgers University in 1965, and later known as Kilmer Campus, is one of the five sub-campuses that make up Rutgers' New Brunswick/Piscataway area campus. The campus was originally built to house Livingston College. The majority of its land is the Rutgers Ecological Preserve. Most of the campus is within the boundaries of Piscataway, but parts extend into Highland Park and Edison.

Campus history 
University buildings were erected on the Kilmer Area land in Piscataway, between Metlars and Cedar Lanes starting in 1969, with the creation of Livingston College. The land had formerly been part of the U.S. Army's Camp Kilmer, a staging area during World War II. The army reserve continued using a small part of the original army campus until 2009. The Livingston College campus currently sits on 540-acres acquired by Rutgers in 1964.

A large amount of parking was created on this campus, mainly because the Louis Brown Athletic Center served as the temporary home of the New Jersey Nets basketball team from 1977 to 1981.

Student center facilities were initially located in Tillett Hall. The Livingston Student Center opened in 1986.

The campus was renamed as Livingston Campus in 1991 following a student campaign in honor of William Livingston.

In fall 2007, Rutgers University consolidated several undergraduate liberal arts colleges in the New Brunswick-Piscataway area, including Livingston College, to a School of Arts and Sciences, but Livingston Campus continues to serve the Rutgers community.

Campus revitalization

In 2009, Livingston Campus installed a large swath of solar panels on its campus (mostly over large, open-air parking lots), one of the largest such groupings of solar panels in New Jersey.

In 2010, the renovated and expanded Livingston Student Center was completed.

In 2011, the campus opened the Livingston Dining Commons to replace Tillett Dining Hall.

In 2012, the new Livingston Apartments opened.

In 2012, The Plaza at Livingston, which contains the Livingston Apartments, a cinema, eateries, and stores, opened.

In fall 2013, the new Rutgers Business School building opened at 100 Rockafeller Road, Piscataway, New Jersey.
Also in 2013, Tillett Hall renovations finished.

In 2021, the RAC has been renamed the Jersey Mike's Arena. It was announced in November that Rutgers and Jersey Mike's Subs have reached a multi-year agreement to make the sub-franchise an official partner for Rutgers Scarlet Knights.

Roadways

The campus has several generically named roads, such as "Road 1," "Road 2," and "Avenue E," which date back to the campus's military days. Efforts to rename the roads have failed to date.

Livingston Campus and adjacent Busch Campus received their own exits on Piscataway's Route 18 expressway, completed in 2005, expediting inter-campus bus travel to these and the College Avenue Campus and the Douglass-Cook Campus across the Raritan River in New Brunswick.

Buildings on Livingston Campus 

The Plaza at Livingston- includes a movie theater, eateries and cafes, a tech store, and a nail salon .
100 Rockafeller Road (100 Rock) — Rutgers Business School
Tillett Hall — Named after Paul Tillett, a political science professor, who played a major part in the planning of Livingston College. This building holds the post office, the learning center, the counseling center, the departments of Psychology (part) and Latino and Hispanic Caribbean studies, computer labs, and various classrooms. (Source: Catalogue of Building and Place Names at Rutgers)
Livingston Dining Commons — The dining hall on Livingston campus, completed in summer of 2011, replaced Tillett Dining Hall. It is adjacent to the Livingston Student Center.
James Dickson Carr Library, known until 2017 as Kilmer Area Library/Media Center
Jersey Mike's Arena
Lucy Stone Hall — Named after Lucy Stone, the founder of the New Jersey Woman's Suffrage Association, this building holds many administrative offices, the departments of African, Middle Eastern, and South Asian Languages and Literatures, Sociology, Geography, Criminal Justice, Center for African Studies, as well as many classrooms and a few lecture halls. (Source: Catalogue of Building and Place Names at Rutgers)
Livingston Student Center — Home of student organizations such as 90.3 the Core RLC-WVPH and The Livingston Theatre Company. This building also has a convenience store and several retail food vendors.
Livingston Recreation Center (renovated in the Winter of 2007), originally known as the Livingston Gym.
Ernest A. Lynton Towers (Residence Halls)(colloquially known as "The Towers") is an interconnected 8 floor dorm complex. They are named after Ernest A. Lynton, who was first a physics professor at Rutgers and then became Livingston College's founding dean.  After leaving Rutgers, he later wrote and spoke extensively about "crises of purpose" in America's universities. Consisting of both double and single occupancy dorm rooms, he towers house approximately 350 students each for a total of approximately 700 freshmen and transfer students.  Until a period of extensive nearby construction in 2012-2014, they were for many years the tallest buildings on Livingston Campus.
Livingston Quads (Residence Halls) Each of the Quad Residence Halls (Quad 1, 2, and 3) consists of multiple buildings surrounding a central courtyard and connected by a tunnel. These halls house both freshmen and transfer students in either single or double occupancy dorms.
Beck Hall (classrooms, chemistry laboratories and lecture hall) — Named after Lewis Caleb Beck, Professor of Chemistry and Natural Philosophy, Rutgers College, 1830-53 (Catalogue of Building and Place Names at Rutgers).
Janice H. Levin Building (one of the buildings of Rutgers Business School—New Brunswick) — Named after a benefactor 
Livingston/Busch Health Center
Livingston Day Care Center
Rutgers University Asian American Cultural Center (AACC) — founded in 1999
Livingston Classroom Building (modular building structure)
Neurotoxicology laboratories
Many maintenance and storage buildings are also located on Livingston Campus.  Some of these are original facilities from Camp Kilmer.
The Livingston Arts Building (Mason Gross Sculpture Department)
Rutgers iTV Studio
Rutgers Makerspace
Livingston Apartments (A, B, and C)
Starbucks, Qdoba Mexican Grill, Rutgers Cinema, Kilmer's Market, kite+key Rutgers Tech Store, Hoja Asian Fusion, Henry's Diner, 16 Handles, and The Wright Cut

Former buildings
 Livingston Bookstore — (Closed following the 2011-2012 academic year and demolished the following year.)

References

External links 

 
 Rutgers iTV website

Rutgers University
Rutgers University Livingston Campus
Geography of Middlesex County, New Jersey
Rutgers University buildings